Glen Moore (born October 28, 1941) is an American jazz bassist, who occasionally performs on piano, flute and violin.

Moore was born in Portland, Oregon, United States. His performing career began at age 14 with the Young Oregonians in Portland, where he met and played with Native American saxophonist, Jim Pepper. He graduated with a degree in History and Literature from the University of Oregon. His formal bass instruction started after college with Jerome Magil in Portland, James Harnett in Seattle, Gary Karr in New York, Plough Christenson in Copenhagen, Ludwig Streicher in Vienna and Francois Rabbath in Hawaii. His main instrument is an upright bass which was made by Klotz in Tyrol around 1715. He mostly plays it in a personal unique tuning, using a low and a high C string.

Moore is a founding member of Oregon, but worked also regularly with Rabih Abou-Khalil, Vasant Rai, Nancy King and Larry Karush.

Discography
 Trios / Solos with Ralph Towner (ECM, 1972)
 May 24, 1976 with Larry Karush (JAPO/ECM, 1976)
 In Concert with David Friesen (Vanguard, 1977)
 Introducing Glen Moore (Elektra, 1979)
 Mokave Volume 1 (Audioquest, 1991)
 Mokave Volume 2 (Audioquest, 1992)
 Returning with David Friesen (1993)
 Forces of Flight (ITM, 1995)
 Dragonetti's Dream (Intuition, 1996)
 Nude Bass Ascending (Intuition, 1999)

With the Paul Winter Consort
 Road (1970)

With Oregon
 Our First Record (Vanguard, recorded 1970, released 1980)
 Music of Another Present Era (Vanguard, 1972)
 Distant Hills (Vanguard, 1973)
 Winter Light (Vanguard, 1974)
 In Concert (Vanguard, 1975)
 Together (Vanguard, 1976), with Elvin Jones
 Friends (Vanguard, 1977)
 Violin (Vanguard, 1978), with Zbigniew Seifert
 Moon and Mind (Vanguard, 1979)
 Out of the Woods (Elektra, 1978)
 Roots in the Sky (Elektra, 1979)
 In Performance (Elektra, 1980)
 Oregon (ECM, 1983)
 Crossing (ECM, 1984)
 Ecotopia (ECM, 1987)
 45th Parallel (Intuition, 1989)
 Always, Never, and Forever (Intuition, 1991)
 Troika (Intuition, 1993)
 Beyond Words (Intuition, 1995)
 Northwest Passage (Intuition, 1997)
 Music for a Midsummer Night's Dream (the Oregon Trio) (Intuition, 1998)
 In Moscow (Intuition, 2000), with the Moscow Tchaikovsky Symphony Orchestra
 Live at Yoshi's (Intuition, 2002)
 Prime (CAM Jazz, 2005)
 The Glide (CAM Jazz, 2005)
 1000 Kilometers (CAM Jazz, 2007)
 In Stride (CAM Jazz, 2010)
 Family Tree (CAM Jazz, 2012)

With Rabih Abou-Khalil
 Al-Jadida (Enja, 1990)
 Between Dusk and Dawn (1994) 
 Bukrah (1994)
 Tarab (Enja, 1993)
 Roots and Sprouts (1994) 

With King & Moore
 Impending Bloom (1990) with Rob Thomas, Jerry Hahn, Lawrence Williams
 Cliff Dance (1991) with Warren Rand, Art Lande, Gary Hobbs
 Potato Radio (1992) with Bennie Wallace, Art Lande, Gary Hobbs
 King on the Road (1999) with Rob Scheps

As sideman
 This Is It (1967) with Nick Brignola
 This Is Jeremy Steig (Solid State, 1969) with Jeremy Steig
 Bass Is (1970) with Dave Holland, Jamie Faunt, Peter Warren
 Revenge: Bley Peacock Synthesizer Show (1970) with Annette Peacock, Paul Bley
 The Paul Bley Synthesizer Show (1971) with Paul Bley
 Bird on Wire (1971) with Tim Hardin
 I'm the One (1972)  Annette Peacock
 The Restful Mind (1975) with Larry Coryell
 Spring Flowers (1976) Vasant Rai
 No Age (1987) Minimal Kidds
 Afrique (Sledgehammer Blues, 1993) with Larry Karush and Glen Velez
 Birdfingers (2002) with Larry Coryell

References

1941 births
Living people
American jazz double-bassists
Male double-bassists
Musicians from Portland, Oregon
University of Oregon alumni
Blue Coast Records artists
21st-century double-bassists
21st-century American male musicians
American male jazz musicians
Jazz musicians from Oregon
Oregon (band) members
Paul Winter Consort members
Origin Records artists
ECM Records artists
Elektra Records artists